The Noose is an American silent drama film adaptation of the Willard Mack play The Noose, which was released in 1928. It stars Richard Barthelmess, Montagu Love, Robert Emmett O'Connor, and Thelma Todd. The movie was adapted by Garrett Graham and James T. O'Donohoe from the play.  It was directed by John Francis Dillon and Richard Barthelmess's performance was nominated for the Academy Award for Best Actor.

The film survives at the Museum of Modern Art in New York City. The play was also the basis of the Paramount Pictures film I'd Give My Life (1936).

Cast
Richard Barthelmess as Nickie Elkins
Montagu Love as Buck Gordon
Robert Emmett O'Connor as Jim Conley
Jay Eaton as Tommy
Lina Basquette as Dot
Thelma Todd as Phyllis
Ed Brady as Seth McMillan
Fred Warren as Dave, Pianist
Alice Joyce as Mrs. Bancroft
Will Walling as Warden (credited as William Walling)
Robert T. Haines as Governor
Ernest Hilliard as Craig
Emile Chautard as Priest
Romaine Fielding as Judge
Yola d'Avril as Cabaret Girl

uncredited
William B. Davidson as Bill Chase
Mike Donlin as Waiter
Joseph W. Girard as Captain of the Guards
Bob Kortman as Death Row Convict
Ivan Linow as Death Row Convict
Charles McMurphy as Bar Patron
Monte Montague as Guard
George H. Reed as Death Row Inmate
Hector Sarno as Rival Hood
Harry Semels as Waiter
Charles Sullivan as Head Waiter

References

External links

Lobby poster

1928 films
American black-and-white films
American silent feature films
1928 drama films
1920s English-language films
Films directed by John Francis Dillon
American films based on plays
First National Pictures films
Silent American drama films
1920s American films